Ælfwold (or Ælfwold I) was a medieval Bishop of Sherborne.

Ælfwold was consecrated after 958 to around 963. He died in 978.

Citations

References

External links
 

Bishops of Sherborne (ancient)
978 deaths
10th-century English bishops
Year of birth unknown